Aquí mando yo (International Title: I Am The Boss) is a Chilean telenovela produced and broadcast by TVN.

Plot
Sofía Kuncar (María Elena Swett) is a successful executive, who is promoted to regional manager for Latin America at the headhunting company where she works. She has two daughters, Antonella (Catalina Castelblanco) and Chiara (Emilia Burr), with her ex-husband Diego Buzzoni (Jorge Zabaleta), a radio personality. Since her job now requires Sofía to travel constantly between New York City, Chicago, and other U.S. cities and Santiago, Sofía decides to ask Diego to take care of their daughters. Though Sofía is dating Jorge Camacho (Cristián Riquelme), her boss, and has been separated from her ex-husband for 4 years, Diego is still in love with her.

Cast
 Jorge Zabaleta - Diego Buzzoni
 María Elena Swett - Sofía Kuncar, Diego's ex-wife
 Cristián Riquelme - Jorge Camacho, Sofía's boss and boyfriend
 Carolina Varleta - Anita Bilbao, Sofía's neighbour and best friend, interested in Diego
 Coca Guazzini - Rocío Leighton, Sofía's mother
 Jaime Vadell - Pedro Montenegro, Maximiliano's father
 Fernando Larraín - Maximiliano Montenegro, Pedro's son, María Carolina's ex-husband
 Begoña Basauri - María Carolina Silva, Maximiliano's ex-wife
 Rodrigo Muñoz - Arnoldo Grez
 Yamila Reyna - Laura Mazza, Arnoldo's girlfriend
 Fernando Farías - Gino Buzzoni, Diego's father
 Loreto Valenzuela - Carmen Morales, Diego's mother
 Catalina Castelblanco - Antonella Buzzoni, Sofía and Diego's elder daughter
 Alonso Quintero - Rodrigo Montenegro, Maximiliano's son
 Constanza Piccoli - Isabel Grez, Arnoldo's daughter
 Hernán Contreras - Cristián Grez, Arnoldo's son
 Catalina Vallejos - Josefina Egaña, Cristián's girlfriend.
 Nicolás Vigneaux - Franco Bilbao, Anita's son
 Emilia Burr - Kiara Buzzoni, Sofía and Diego's younger daughter
 Antonella Castagno - Margarita Egaña

Reception
The telenovela was received with successful ratings. Terra.cl claims that this circumstance is "reactivating" the 20:00 weekday timeslot, when as of early 2011 only TVN was broadcasting telenovelas, after Canal 13 pulled off its productions, and that even Mega and Chilevisión were considering competing with their own series. The critic at queveo.cl, a website by parents concerned with the media their children consume, praises the acting of Zabaleta and Swett and celebrates the "return" of family-oriented telenovelas.

References

External links
 Official website 

2011 telenovelas
2011 Chilean television series debuts
2012 Chilean television series endings
Chilean telenovelas
Spanish-language telenovelas
Televisión Nacional de Chile telenovelas